ONSC may refer to:
 Old North State Council, a local council of the Boy Scouts of America serveinb the western Piedmont Triad region of North Carolina
 Ontario Superior Court of Justice